The Director-General of the Police (DGP) of Spain is a high-ranking official in the Ministry of the Interior. The Director-General is nominated by the Minister of Home Affairs after consulting to the Council of Ministers and he or she is appointed by the Monarch. The director general reports directly to the Secretary of State for Security and has rank of Under Secretary.

The director general heads the Directorate-General, commands the National Police Corps and is in charge of the ordination, direction, coordination and execution of the missions entrusted to the police fulfilling with the orders received from the Ministry of the Interior. In addition, he or she directs and coordinates the services and the central and peripheral organs of the National Police. The DGP is also in charge of giving its personnel the human and material resources to fulfill with their obligations, to establish collaboration relationships with other public and private bodies, to oversight the behavior of the personnel, to promote or degrade the police officers and promoting activities to improve the training of the officers.

In the international sphere, the director general is the official responsible to offer the collaboration and help of the National Police Corps to other foreign law enforcements agencies, to collect, analyse and distribute information between national and international bodies necessary to guarantee the security of the country or allied countries and he or she is also in charge of the matters relating foreigners, passports, IDs, drugs, gambling...

History
The current office of Director-General of the Police was created on May 10, 1979 to lead the two main law-enforcements agencies that at that time formed the Police: the Superior Police Corps and the National Police Corps.

The Superior Police Corps, commonly known as Secret Police, were a police force responsible for the investigation of crimes, the recollection and analysis of information, the issuance of passports and IDs, as well as controlling migration matters and cooperate with foreign police corps. The National Police Corps was designed as an auxiliary police corps of the Superior Police Corps and was oriented to grant the security of citizents, patrol and protect police buildings.

In 1986, a new Police Forces Act was approved and a major change happened. The two law-enforcement agencies —Superior Police Corps and National Police Corps— merged into one national forced that assumed all the competencies of the service, becoming the now unified National Police Corps.

Between September 2006 and December 2011, the Directorates-General of the Police and of the Civil Guard were merged by Prime Minister Zapatero with the purpose of «carry out the tasks of both police forces in a more integral, homogeneous and coordinated way». In 2008, it was known that the Interior Minister, Alfredo Pérez Rubalcaba, was not comfortable with this union of command and wanted to split them again, but that wasn't the opinion of the Prime Minister and remained together.

With the arrival of Prime Minister Rajoy to the government, he decided to split the command again considering that the coordination task was a duty of the Secretary of State for Security and that every agency needed to have their own command.

List of directors general

References

1979 establishments in Spain
Law enforcement in Spain
Spanish police officers
Spain